Buftea is a town in Ilfov County, Muntenia, Romania, located  north-west of Bucharest. One village, Buciumeni, is administered by the town.

The film studios MediaPro Pictures and the Buftea Palace of the Știrbei family are located in Buftea.

It is the hometown of Olympic bronze medalist and two-time European Champion rower Daniela Druncea.

Natives
 Mihai Aioani
 Marius Bâtfoi
 Elisa Brătianu
 Alina Eremia
 Daniela Druncea
 Nicolae Grigore
 Constantin Lupulescu
 Barbu Știrbey

References

Towns in Romania
Populated places in Ilfov County
Localities in Muntenia